The Interlake Formation is a stratigraphical unit of Silurian age in the Western Canadian Sedimentary Basin. 

It takes the name from the Interlake Region in Manitoba, and was first described in outcrop by A.D. Baillie in 1951.

Lithology
The Interlake Formation is composed of very finely crystalline dolomite.

Oolitic, stromatolitic and biohermal interbeds also occur.

Distribution
The Interlake Formation is present throughout the Williston Basin.

Relationship to other units

The Interlake Formation is overlain with an angular unconformably by the Ashern Formation and sharply overlays the Stonewall Formation.

In the sub-surface it is given group status and contains, in different regions, the following subdivisions:
Strathclair, Brandon and Cedar Lake Formations
Lower, Middle and Upper Interlake
Rupert, Hansen and Risser Formations
Strathclair, Fife Lake, Guernsey, Cedar Lake and Taylorton Formations

References

Silurian Alberta
Silurian Manitoba
Silurian Saskatchewan
Western Canadian Sedimentary Basin